The Nor Bayazet or Novobayazet uezd was a county (uezd) of the Erivan Governorate of the Caucasus Viceroyalty of the Russian Empire. The uezd bordered the Alexandropol uezd to the north, the Etchmiadzin and Erivan uezds to the west, the Sharur-Daralayaz uezd to the south, and the Kazakh, Elizavetpol, and Jevanshir uezds of the Elizavetpol Governorate to the east. Centered on Lake Sevan, the Nor Bayazet uezd included most of the contemporary province of Gegharkunik and northern parts of the Kotayk Province of Armenia. The administrative center of the uezd was the city Novobayazet (present-day Gavar) for which the district was eponymously named.

In 1916, the district was over 90% rural and home to over 129,300 Armenians and 53,700 Muslims (including 3,000 Kurds). Resulting from the Ottoman invasion of the South Caucasus, in 1918–1920 the population of the district contracted significantly due to famine and large-scale ethnic cleansing.

History 
The administrative center of the uezd, Novobayazet, as indicated by its name meaning "New Bayazıt", was founded by Armenian immigrants from Doğubayazıt in the early 19th century who accompanied the withdrawing Imperial Russian Army to escape persecution in the Ottoman Empire.

After the Russian Revolution, conditions in the Nor Bayazet uezd were worsened by the presence of 60,000 refugees in 1918. Over the winter of 1918–1919, some 25,000 people in the uezd starved to death. Whilst controlled by the First Republic of Armenia, the Nor Bayazet uezd in 1918–1919 was emptied of its Muslim population by the destruction of 100 villages by the Armenian army, however, this was instigated by agents of the Azerbaijan Democratic Republic trying to provoke ethnic clashes. Moreover, the "Nor Bayazet commission" in the Armenian parliament led by  claimed that 88 villages and 72,000 inhabitants of Nor Bayazet had been subject to raids by Muslims.

Administrative divisions 
The subcounties (uchastoks) of the Nor Bayazet uezd in 1913 were as follows:

Demographics

Russian Empire Census 
The majority of the population indicated Armenian to be their mother tongue, with a significant Tatar speaking minority.

Kavkazskiy kalendar 
The statistics indicated the city of Nor Bayazet and its peripheries to be overwhelmingly Armenian, with a significant Shia Muslim minority:

Notes

References

Bibliography 

Gavar
Gegharkunik Province
Kotayk Province
Uezds of Erivan Governorate